Capçanes is a Catalan village in the province of Tarragona in north-eastern Spain. It is situated in the comarca of Priorat.

Geography 
Capçanes is situated about 7 km (4.4 mi) south of Falset, 40 km (25 mi) west of Tarragona, and about 160 km (100 mi) south-west of Barcelona.

Economy 
The village's main activity is agriculture, predominantly wine-growing, but also olive and almond production.

Sights 
 Monument to Carrasclet, who was born in the village, by Francesc Carulla i Serra.
 Wine-growers' cooperative, founded in 1933.

Sons and daughters of the village 
Pere Joan Barceló i Anguera (1687–1741), a.k.a. Carrasclet ("Carbon seller," a reference to his occupation), guerrillero, who fought in the War of Spanish Succession on the side of Archduke Charles of Austria against the Bourbons and who died in exile.

References

External links 
 https://web.archive.org/web/20071109080108/http://www.priorat.org/fitxapobles.php?id_recurso=75&id_fotos=8 Priorat tourist information (Catalan)
 http://www.cellercapcanes.com Wine-growers' cooperative
 Government data pages 

Municipalities in Priorat